Habich is a surname. Notable people with the surname include:

Edward Jan Habich, Polish engineer and mathematician
Hermann Habich (1895–?), German World War I flying ace
Matthias Habich, German actor

See also
Habicht, a mountain in Austria

German-language surnames